Robert Flacelière (29 May 1904, Paris –  23 May 1982, Montpellier) was a scholar of Classical Greek. He was educated at the Collège Sainte-Barbe, the Lycée Henri IV and the École Normale Supérieure. From 1925 to 1930, he was a member of the French School in Athens and from 1932-1948 a Professor of the Faculty of Letters at University of Lyon. He was then appointed to the Chair of Greek Language and Literature at the University of Paris, a post he held until 1963 when he was appointed Director of the École Normale Supérieure.

Bibliography

with Jean Daniélou Jean Chrysostome, Homélies sur l'incompréhensible, Sources Chrétiennes 28

English translations (selected)

References

École Normale Supérieure alumni
French classical scholars
French hellenists
French philologists
Members of the Académie des Inscriptions et Belles-Lettres
Lycée Henri-IV alumni
Scientists from Paris
1904 births
1982 deaths
20th-century French historians
20th-century philologists